Andrés Jair Rentería Morelo (born 6 March 1993), commonly known as Andrés Rentería, is a Colombian footballer who plays as a forward for Deportes Tolima. He is a naturalized citizen of Mexico.

Club career

Atlético Nacional and Alianza Petrolera
Rentería started his career in Atlético Nacional's youth teams, and debuted in the first team on 4 March 2012, in the 1–0 defeat against Cúcuta Deportivo, coming on as an 81st-minute substitute for Diego Álvarez. He began his career as a centre forward, but eventually adopted its current position of winger.

On 30 June, he was loaned to Primera B club Alianza Petrolera. He debuted for the team on 28 July, in the 1–4 win against Uniautónoma, where he scored the 4 goals of his team. He would score 14 goals in 21 matches, becoming the season's top scorer and helping to Alianza Petrolera to get promotion to the Categoría Primera A for the first time in its history.

Santos Laguna
On 11 December 2012, Rentería was sold to Liga MX club Santos Laguna. He debuted for the team on 20 January, in the 2–1 defeat against Puebla. Rentería would score his first goal on 12 May, in the 1–3 win against Atlas.

Cruz Azul
On July 21, 2018, Renteria made his debut with Cruz Azul and scored his 1st goal in the 80th minute in a 3-0 victory against Puebla.

On 28 January 2019 it was confirmed, that Renteria would spend the rest of 2019 on loan at San Lorenzo.

International career
Rentería was called for the Colombia U20 squad of the 2013 Toulon Tournament. He played 4 matches, and scored a goal in the 80th minute of the 1–3 win against France U20.

He also was called for the squad that played the 2013 FIFA U-20 World Cup in Turkey, where he played 3 matches, and scored a goal in the 21st minute of the 0–3 win against El Salvador U-20.

On 22 March 2015 he was called up by Colombia national team for the friendlies against Bahrain and Kuwait. He made his international debut four days later, coming on as a second-half substitute for Radamel Falcao García, assisting Johan Mojica in the 79th minute and scoring in the 82nd, assisted by Mojica himself in a 6-0 win.

On 25 March 2016, Rentería made his debut for the Colombia Olympic football team in the 2016 Summer Olympics CONCACAF–CONMEBOL play-off. Subsequently the team qualified to the 2016 Summer Olympics.

Career statistics

Club

International

International appearances

Under-20

Senior

Olympic

International goals

Under-20 
Scores and results lists Colombia's goal tally first.

Senior 
Scores and results lists Colombia's goal tally first.

Honours

Club
Alianza Petrolera
Primera B: 2012

Santos Laguna
Liga MX: Clausura 2015
Copa MX: Apertura 2014
Campeón de Campeones: 2015

Querétaro
Copa MX: Apertura 2016

Cruz Azul
Copa MX: Apertura 2018

Individual
Primera B - Torneo Finalización top goalscorer: 2012
Copa MX top goalscorer: Apertura 2014

References

External links
 
 
 

1993 births
Living people
Colombian footballers
Association football forwards
Atlético Nacional footballers
Alianza Petrolera players
Santos Laguna footballers
Querétaro F.C. footballers
Cruz Azul footballers
San Lorenzo de Almagro footballers
Águilas Doradas Rionegro players
Independiente Santa Fe footballers
Categoría Primera A players
Categoría Primera B players
Liga MX players
Argentine Primera División players
Colombian expatriate footballers
Expatriate footballers in Mexico
Expatriate footballers in Argentina
Colombian expatriate sportspeople in Mexico
Colombian expatriate sportspeople in Argentina
Colombia under-20 international footballers
Colombia international footballers
Naturalized citizens of Mexico
Footballers from Medellín
Footballers at the 2016 Summer Olympics
Olympic footballers of Colombia